The FC Basel 1919–20 season was their twentyseventh season since the club's foundation on 15 November 1893. The club's chairman was Bernard Klingelfuss. FC Basel played their home games in the Landhof in the district Wettstein in Kleinbasel.

Overview 
Otto Kuhn was team captain and acted, so to say, as coach. Basel played a total of 44 matches in their 1919–20 season. 14 of these were in the domestic league and 30 were friendly matches.

From these 30 friendlies, 15 were against foreign opponents. Five were played against German teams. Basel travelled to Germany and played against Karlsruher FV, 1. FFC Germania 1894 and 1. FC Pforzheim. During the winter break the team travelled to Italy and on Christmas day played against Genoa C.F.C., on boxing day against SG Andrea Doria and the next day against US Biellese. They also played at home against Rapid Wien. At the end of the season Basel were hosts to Victoria Hamburg, Royal Charleroi SC, Royale Union Saint-Gilloise, Budapesti EAC, Ferencvárosi TC, MTK Budapest and Wiener Amateur Sportverein. Altogether 14 friendlies were home games, played in the Landhof and 16 were away games. Of these 18 ended in a victory, one match was drawn and 11 ended in a defeat. In these test games Basel scored a total of 68 goals and conceded 44. 

The former Hungarian international footballer Alfréd Schaffer joined Basel in April 1920 and played in 19 test matches and one league games, during which he scored a total of 27 goals.

The domestic league, Swiss Serie A 1919–20, was divided into three regional groups, East, Central and West, each group with eight teams. FC Basel and the two other teams from Basel Nordstern and Old Boys were allocated to the Central group. The other teams playing in this group were Aarau, Luzern and Biel-Bienne and the two teams from the capital, Young Boys and FC Bern. FC Basel played a good season, winning seven matches, drawing four and suffering just three defeats. They ended the season in second position with 18 points. In their 14 games Basel scored 32 goals and conceded 20. Karl Wüthrich was the team's top goal scorer with 9 goals. BSC Young Boys won the group and continued to the finals. 

There was no relegation this year because the reserve team Nordstern were Serie B champions and could not be promoted because the first team already plays at top level. With a victory against Servette and a goalless draw against Grasshopper Club the Young Boys won the Swiss championship.

The Serie A away match played on 7 March 1920 against Biel-Bienne in Gurzelen Stadion was the last game that Wilhelm Dietz played as he died 4 weeks later aged just 19 years old.

Players 
Squad members

Results 

Legend

Friendly matches

Pre- and mid-season

Winter break to end of season

Serie A

Central Group results 

FC Biel-Bienne declared Forfait. As a replacement, a friendly match against Winterthur took place on the same date.

Central Group league table

See also
 History of FC Basel
 List of FC Basel players
 List of FC Basel seasons

References

Sources 
 Rotblau: Jahrbuch Saison 2014/2015. Publisher: FC Basel Marketing AG. 
 Die ersten 125 Jahre. Publisher: Josef Zindel im Friedrich Reinhardt Verlag, Basel. 
 FCB team 1919–20 at fcb-archiv.ch
 Switzerland 1919-20 at RSSSF

External links
 FC Basel official site

FC Basel seasons
Basel